A metabolic disorder is a disorder that negatively alters the body's processing and distribution of macronutrients, such as proteins, fats, and carbohydrates. Metabolic disorders can happen when abnormal chemical reactions in the body alter the normal metabolic process. It can also be defined as inherited single gene anomaly, most of which are autosomal recessive.

Signs and symptoms
Some of the symptoms that can occur with metabolic disorders are lethargy, weight loss, jaundice and seizures. The symptoms expressed would vary with the type of metabolic disorder. There are four categories of symptoms: acute symptoms, late-onset acute symptoms, progressive general symptoms and permanent symptoms.

Causes

Inherited metabolic disorders are one cause of metabolic disorders, and occur when a defective gene causes an enzyme deficiency. These diseases, of which there are many subtypes, are known as inborn errors of metabolism. Metabolic diseases can also occur when the liver or pancreas do not function properly.

Types 
The principal classes of metabolic disorders are:

Diagnosis

Metabolic disorders can be present at birth, and many can be identified by routine screening. If a metabolic disorder is not identified early, then it may be diagnosed later in life, when symptoms appear. Specific blood and DNA tests can be done to diagnose genetic metabolic disorders.

The gut microbiota, which is a population of microbes that live in the human digestive system, also has an important part in metabolism and generally has a positive function for its host. In terms of pathophysiological/mechanism interactions, an abnormal gut microbiota can play a role in metabolic disorder related obesity.

Screening
Metabolic disorder screening can be done in newborns via blood, skin, or hearing tests.

Management
Metabolic disorders can be treatable by nutrition management, especially if detected early. It is important for dieticians to have knowledge of the genotype to create a treatment that will be more effective for the individual.

See also 
 Metabolic syndrome
 Metabolic Myopathies
 Lysosomal storage disease
 Deficiency disease
 Hypermetabolism

References

Further reading

External links 
 

Metabolism
Endocrinology
Medical genetics